Blackout is a 2012 three-part British television drama series produced by Red Production Company. A corrupt council official wakes from an alcoholic blackout to realise that he may have been responsible for a murder. He soon begins a dramatic quest for redemption. The series is directed by Tom Green and written by Bill Gallagher.

Plot
After an alcoholic binge corrupt council official Daniel Demoys (Christopher Eccleston) awakes from a blackout and circumstances lead him to believe he may be responsible for a murder.  While trying to establish the events of the blackout he attempts to redeem himself, to such a degree that he finds himself a mayoral candidate with the public's backing.  However, Daniel also begins a relationship with Detective Dalien Bevan's ex-wife, while the Detective is investigating the murder.

Cast 
 Christopher Eccleston as Daniel Demoys 
 Dervla Kirwan as Alex Demoys
 Ewen Bremner as Jerry Durrans
 Karl Collins as Bo 
 Andrew Scott as Dalien Bevan 
 MyAnna Buring as Sylvie Mills
 Branka Katić as Donna Harris
 David Hayman as Henry Pulis 
 Rebecca Callard as Ruth Pulis 
 Wunmi Mosaku as Millie Coswell 
 Lyndsey Marshal as Lucy Demoys
 Danny Sapani as D.I. Griffin 
 Stuart McQuarrie as Eddie Dayton 
 Danny Kelly as Billy Sutton
 Oliver Woollford as Luke Demoys
 Lorenzo Rodriguez as Charlie Demoys 
 Olivia Cooke as Meg Demoys
 Osy Ikhile as Nelson Venner

Production
Blackout was commissioned for BBC One by Ben Stephenson, (Drama Commissioning), and Danny Cohen, (Controller, BBC One). The producer is Matthew Bird and director is Tom Green. Executive Producers are Christopher Aird for BBC, Nicola Shindler for Red Production Company, and written by Bill Gallagher. The programme was mostly filmed in Manchester, and includes scenes which were filmed in Manchester Town Hall and Manchester Civil Justice Centre.

Reception
The mini-series launched on BBC One on 2 July 2012. It attracted 4.47m viewers (19.6% of UK terrestrial viewers) in the 9pm time slot.

Writing for The Telegraph, Ben Lawrence commended the performances, including those of Eccleston and Scott, but said: "I didn't love Blackout; perhaps because it was so in love with itself. I was crying out for a bit of idiosyncratic dialogue, or some geographical reference to take me out of its noirish hinterland." Jasper Rees writing for The Arts Desk referenced Danish drama The Killing in his review, as did Arifa Akbar in The Independent, who said: "You can see how Blackout'''s creators have put flecks of Macbeth, and even The Killing'' in the mix, with its blend of political drama, morality play and crime thriller, but none of it works."

References

External links
 

 BBC Media Centre Program Information 
 Blackout page on Red Production Company website

BBC television dramas
2010s British drama television series
2012 British television series debuts
2012 British television series endings
2010s British television miniseries
English-language television shows
Television shows set in Manchester